John S. Stevens may refer to
 John Sanborn Stevens (1838–1912), American lawyer from Illinois
 John Shorter Stevens (1933–2019), American lawyer from North Carolina
 R. J. S. Stevens (born Richard John Samuel Stevens; 1757–1837), English composer and organist

See also
John Stevens (disambiguation)
Jack Stevens (disambiguation)